David Patrick Paul Alton, Baron Alton of Liverpool,  (born 15 March 1951) is a British politician.

He is a former Liberal Party and later Liberal Democrat Member of Parliament who has sat as a crossbench member of the House of Lords since 1997 when he was made a life peer. Alton is also known for his human rights work including the co-founding of Jubilee Action, the children's charity (which changed its name to Chance for Childhood in 2014), and serves as chair, patron or trustee of several charities and voluntary organisations.

Education and entry into politics
Born in London on 15 March 1951, His father was a Desert Rat who had served in the Eighth Army, and then worked for the Ford Motor Company. His mother was a native Irish speaker from the West of Ireland. After being rehoused from the East End, Alton was brought up in a council flat on an overspill council estate. He passed a scholarship exam to join the first intake of a new Jesuit grammar school and was educated at the Campion School, Hornchurch, Essex, and Christ's College of Education, Liverpool. He began his career as a teacher and, in 1972, was elected as a Liberal to Liverpool City Council as Britain's youngest city councillor. Alton was elected for the Low Hill ward, serving from 1972 to 1974, then, after the Local Government Act 1974, he was elected for the Smithdown ward where he served for the next six years. Alton was also a member of Merseyside County Council for the Smithdown division from 1974 to 1977 and chairman of the housing committee. He was deputy leader of Liverpool City Council from 1978 to 1980.

Political career
Alton was elected as Member of Parliament for Liverpool Edge Hill at a by-election in 1979 for the Liberal Party, when he became the "Baby of the House", achieving a record swing of 36.8% and 64% of the vote. He won the seat the day after the Callaghan Government was defeated in a vote of confidence and the 1979 General Election being called. He became the shortest lived MP, a member for less than a week, and made his Maiden Speech within three hours of taking his seat. Five weeks later he was re-elected and went on to serve as a Liverpool MP for 18 years, before standing down. He was the only new member of a Parliamentary Party of 11 MPs. He campaigned on the slogan "Everyone Knows Someone Who Has Been Helped by David Alton." He was notably a very short-serving Baby of the House, as Stephen Dorrell, who was a year younger than Alton, was elected at the 1979 election.

When the Edge Hill constituency was abolished for the 1983 general election, he was elected to represent the new Liverpool Mossley Hill constituency.

From 1979 to 1988 he served at various times as spokesman on the environment, home affairs, Northern Ireland and as Chief Whip. He is known for his anti-abortion position, and in 1987 he resigned as Chief Whip to campaign for his unsuccessful private member's bill which aimed to stop late abortions. He became a Liberal Democrat MP when the Liberal Party merged with the SDP in 1988, but he had difficult relations with parts of the party, especially over attempts to make the party adopt a position in favour of abortion rights. In 1992, he announced that he would not stand again as a Liberal Democrat after the party passed a policy that he believed committed the party to support abortion for the first time.  A motion passed in Spring 1993 stating that the party had no position on the substantive issue of abortion spared him delivering on the promise.

He stood down as an MP at the 1997 general election. He was made a life peer as Baron Alton of Liverpool, of Mossley Hill in the County of Merseyside as a personal choice of John Major in the Dissolution Honours, and took his seat in the House of Lords as a crossbencher.

Alton is chairman of the British-DPRK All-Party Parliamentary Group, and visited Pyongyang in October 2010 when he had talks with leaders of the North Korean government including Choe Thae-bok, the chairman of the Supreme People's Assembly.

On 26 March 2021, it was announced that Alton was one of two members of the House of Lords to be sanctioned by China for spreading what it called "lies and disinformation" about the country. He was subsequently banned from entering China, Hong Kong and Macau, and Chinese citizens and institutions are prohibited from doing business with him. The sanctions were condemned by the Prime Minister and led the Foreign Secretary to summon the Chinese ambassador.

Professor of Citizenship
In 1997, Alton was appointed Professor of Citizenship at Liverpool John Moores University, establishing the Foundation for Citizenship and the Roscoe Lectures. The lecture series explores citizenship and lectures have been given by commentators including the 14th Dalai Lama and Prince Charles.

Human rights

Alton established the lobby group for human rights, Jubilee Campaign, in 1987, with the support of other members of parliament. He also co-founded Jubilee Action, a children's charity established to fulfil the humanitarian needs highlighted by the work of Jubilee Campaign. In 2014 Jubilee Action changed its name to Chance for Childhood.

Alton campaigned against the Human Fertilisation and Embryology Act 2008, opposing the creation and use of animal-human hybrid stem cells for medical purposes.

He is a patron of the International Young Leaders Network and Save the Congo!, a small international rights group founded by the Congolese rights activist Vava Tampa to end the political crisis that continues to give rise to wars, conflicts and violence that have killed over 5.4 million people in Congo.

Support for Hong Kong 
Alton has supported the rights and freedoms of those in Hong Kong, during the 2019–20 Hong Kong protests and regarding the National Security Law imposed by Beijing in June 2020, and its associated clampdowns.  In reaction to pro-Beijing lawmaker Junius Ho's actions regarding women and the LGBT+ community, as well as Ho's alleged support of the Yuen Long attackers, Alton worked with Luke de Pulford to pressure Anglia Ruskin University into rescinding the honorary doctoral degree it had conferred on Ho.  The degree was withdrawn on 29 October 2019.

During the 2019 Hong Kong Polytechnic University conflict, he issued a statement calling for the end to police violence and criticising Chief Executive Carrie Lam.

Trade Bill amendment
In January 2021, Alton influenced the Lords to pass an amendment to the Trade Act 2021 that "would require that the UK does not trade with genocidal regimes. Importantly, with the United Nations having shown itself incapable of making such decisions, the determination of whether genocide has taken place would be made by the High Court of England and Wales."

Honours and arms
Alton has been appointed to two Roman Catholic orders of chivalry; he is a Knight Commander of Merit of the Sacred Military Constantinian Order of Saint George (2003) and a Knight Commander of the Order of St. Gregory the Great (2008).

Personal life
Alton is married, has four children and four grandchildren, and holds both British and Irish citizenship. He resides in Lancashire, UK and is a Roman Catholic.

Books
Lord Alton has published numerous non-fiction titles:
 What Kind of Country? Marshall Pickering 1987
 Whose choice anyway? Marshal Pickering 1988
 Faith in Britain Hodder & Stoughton 1991
 Signs of Contradiction Hodder & Stoughton 1996
 Life After Death Christian Democrat Press 1997
 Citizen Virtues HarperCollins 1999
 Citizen 21 HarperCollins 2001
 Pilgrim Ways St Pauls Publishing 2001
 Passion and Pain (with Michele Lombardo) and accompanying DVD of TV series 2003
 Euthanasia: Getting To The Heart of The Matter (with Martin Foley) 2005
 Abortion: Getting To The Heart of The Matter (with Martin Foley) 2005
 Building Bridges: Is there Hope for North Korea? (with Rob Chidley) Lion 2013

References

External links
 Lord Alton of Liverpool official site
 David Alton official Facebook page
 
 Jubilee Campaign
 Jubilee Action

1951 births
Alumni of Liverpool Hope University
Councillors in Liverpool
Alton of Liverpool
Knights Commander of the Order of St Gregory the Great
Liberal Democrats (UK) MPs for English constituencies
Liberal Party (UK) MPs for English constituencies
Liberal Party (UK) councillors
Living people
Members of the Parliament of the United Kingdom for Liverpool constituencies
UK MPs 1974–1979
UK MPs 1979–1983
UK MPs 1983–1987
UK MPs 1987–1992
UK MPs 1992–1997
Politicians from Liverpool
English people of Irish descent
Life peers created by Elizabeth II